Doubletalk, double talk, or double-talk may refer to:
 Doublespeak, language that is deceptively ambiguous
 Gibberish (language game), a phonetically modified version of English
 Double-talk, speech including nonsense syllables that appears erudite
 Double-talk (telephony), a situation when two people talk at the same time, causing overlapping audio signals

Entertainment
Double Talk, play by Nigel Williams (author)
 Double Talk (game show), a 1986 US game show
 "Double Talk" (The New Batman Adventures), a 1997 episode of The New Batman Adventures